Paremhat 26 - Coptic Calendar - Paremhat 28

The twenty-seventh day of the Coptic month of Paremhat, the seventh month of the Coptic year. In common years, this day corresponds to March 23, of the Julian Calendar, and April 5, of the Gregorian Calendar. This day falls in the Coptic Season of Shemu, the season of the Harvest.

Commemorations

Martyrs 

 The martyrdom of Saint Domicos

Saints 

 The departure of Saint Macarius the Great

Other commemorations 

 The annual commemoration of the Crucifixion of Jesus Christ

References 

Days of the Coptic calendar